The Little White Car is a novel by British author Dan Rhodes, published under the pen name Danuta de Rhodes in 2004 by Canongate. It has been translated into 12 languages. The book's premise, based on real-world evidence, is that the car carrying Diana, Princess of Wales collided with a white Fiat Uno just before it crashed on August 31, 1997.

Plot introduction
In Paris, Veronique has just split up with her boyfriend and is driving home in her "little white car." While passing through a tunnel in central Paris, a large car approaches from behind at high speed.  Veronique is determined to not let it pass, and it collides with the back of her car and crashes. Seeing the news next morning, Veronique realizes that she killed a princess. The remainder of the book tells of Veronique's life and loves before the crash, and the subsequent efforts to conceal her involvement.

References

External links
page from author's website
The Complete Review (including links to reviews in The Guardian, The Independent and the Sunday Telegraph)

2004 British novels
Novels set in Paris
Secret histories
Works published under a pseudonym
Works by Dan Rhodes
Novels based on actual events
Books about Diana, Princess of Wales
Fiction set in 1997
Canongate Books books